Sir John Hay of Alderston, 1st Baronet (died 1706) was created a Baronet of Nova Scotia on 22 February 1703. He was the son of Thomas Hay of Hermiston (died 1607) one of the Clerks of the Court of Session and a Clerk of the Privy Council of Scotland, and Anna, daughter of Sir John Gibson of Pentland, Baronet.

Sir John Hay acquired the feudal barony of Alderston in East Lothian, which had long been a possession of the Hepburn family.

He married 27 April 1693, Catherine, daughter of Sir George Suttie, 1st Baronet of Balgonie, and had issue: two sons, his successors, and three daughters.

References

 History of the Commoners of Great Britain and Ireland etc., by John Burke, London, 1836, vol. 3, p. 437.
 Extinct and Dormant Baronetcies of England, Ireland, and Scotland, by Messrs. John and John Bernard Burke, 2nd edition, London, 1841, p. 626.

Hay, Sir John, 1st baronet of Alderston
Hay, Sir John, 1st Baronet of Alderston
Hay, Sir John, 1st Baronet of Alderston